The Yamaha V Star 1300 (also known as XVS1300A Midnight Star and XVS13AW(C)) is a cruiser motorcycle produced from 2007 to 2017 by Yamaha Motor Company.
It has a fuel injected  V-twin engine, 
The transmission is a five-speed manual with a multi-plate wet clutch and belt drive. 
The bike was designed as a mid-to-high level production cruiser motorcycle and is available in standard and touring versions.

References

XVS13
Cruiser motorcycles
Motorcycles introduced in 2007